The El Dorado County Fair  is held in Placerville, California, every Father's Day weekend. The annual event opens on the third Thursday in June and concludes on the following Sunday evening. 

Started in 1859, the El Dorado County Fair includes four days of exhibitions, contests, competitions, concerts, carnival rides, food, and more. Attractions include the junior livestock auction, and exhibits, featuring items such as photography, food, artwork, homemade wine and homebrew, which are on display throughout the fair's four-day run. Friday night events in the grandstands usually consist of Mutton Bustin' and Humpz and Hornz bull riding. Other activities include cooking demonstrations, free children's workshops, and games for all ages hosted by Flo the Clown, such as: funnel cake eating contests, a bean spitting contest, and big wheels races. The annual John M. Studebaker Championship Wheelbarrow Races take place on Sunday evening in the grandstands. The father and child look-a-like contest takes place on the main stage Sunday as part of the Father's Day activities. Previous El Dorado County Fair sponsors include Home Depot, Gold Country Ace Hardware & Hobbies, among others. 

The fair was cancelled in 1917–1918 due to World War I, and in 1942–1945 because of World War II. The event was also cancelled in 2020 due to COVID-19 pandemic.

The upcoming fair is scheduled for June 15 - 18, 2023.

Other Events 

The large range of events held at the fairgrounds include the county fair, annual Cowboys and Cornbread event (sponsored by El Dorado County Chamber of Commerce, the El Dorado County Visitors Authority, and El Dorado County Fairgrounds), Crab & Chowder Gala,  Fourth of July Family Blast, Art & Wine with Something MORE, Hangtown Halloween Ball, El Dorado County Fair Open Wine Competition,  weddings, cultural events, family reunions, non-profit fundraising events and more. The fairground's Mark D. Forni building (capacity 2285 persons) and the grandstand (capacity 1800 persons) are the only high-capacity facilities along the Highway 50 corridor. Approximately 600 events are held during the year resulting in 267,000 visitors to the fairgrounds annually.

Other Businesses on the Fairgrounds 

 El Dorado County Historical Museum 
 Imagination Theater
 Placerville Speedway 
 Placerville Skate Park

See also
 List of convention centers in the United States

References

External links 

California Fairs Collection, 1856-1997 (1945-1982 bulk) from the archives of California Polytechnic State University

Fairs in California
Annual fairs
Annual events in California
Convention centers in California
Fairgrounds in California
Tourist attractions in El Dorado County, California
Articles containing video clips
Agricultural shows in the United States